Stambaugh Auditorium is located in Youngstown, Ohio in the United States. It was listed on the National Register of Historic Places in 1984.

Stambaugh Auditorium opened in 1926 through the generosity of Henry H. Stambaugh, one of the city's leading businessmen in the early 20th century. Mr. Stambaugh decreed in his Will that there was to be a venue built for the entertainment, enjoyment and education of Youngstown and surrounding communities. The centerpiece of the complex is the Concert Hall, which can accommodate a crowd of 2,553. The venue also features the Jeanne D. Tyler Grand Ballroom, the Anne K. Christman Memorial Hall, and a Formal Garden at the southern end of the building, all of which can be rented for private functions.

Beyond performances, Stambaugh Auditorium is home to multiple spaces which host a variety of events.  Business events and seminars have become increasingly popular in recent times, in addition to a variety of non-profit fundraising events.  Rehearsals and weddings at Stambaugh remain a staple at the facility, accommodating many eager brides using the building's beautiful architecture as a backdrop for their formal photos. Local high schools and some colleges use the auditorium each year to make their graduations memorable, and dance competitions from across the country take advantage of Stambaugh's facilities.

The Concert Hall houses the recently restored E.M. Skinner Pipe Organ, offering local and national organists an opportunity to play on a spectacular, historically accurate instrument.  Many Stambaugh events are offered at reasonable ticket rates and, at times, no cost at all, as to reflect the mission statement outlined by Henry H. Stambaugh's will 89 years ago.  All of these spaces generate the necessary revenue to keep Stambaugh functioning on a daily basis.

History 

In 1926, The Henry H. Stambaugh Memorial Auditorium was dedicated, and a dream of Henry Stambaugh, local industrialist and philanthropist, was realized.  As a bequest to the city of Youngstown, Mr. Stambaugh envisioned a site to "be used for the enjoyment, pleasure, entertainment and education of the community residing in the Youngstown and contiguous thereto…"  The Auditorium was constructed at a cost of $1.3 million, designed by Harvey Wiley Corbett of the New York firm of Helme and Corbett and is modeled after the public auditorium in Springfield, Massachusetts, which was designed from the Pantheon in Paris.
 
On December 5, 1926, a formal dedication was held, and on December 6, 1926, the Monday Musical Club presented the first concert at Stambaugh, featuring humorist Will Rogers.  Since that day, Stambaugh has hosted a wide variety of performers, educators and speakers.  Artists from Tony Bennett to Bob Dylan, American Ballet to Liberace, Bruce Springsteen to the Cleveland Orchestra and countless others have all graced the main stage.

Preservation 

Stambaugh Auditorium has undergone several renovations and restorations to preserve the building's natural integrity.  The Anne Christman Memorial Hall was restored in 1995, followed by the Concert Hall in 2004 and office space improvements in 2004 and 2006. Over the years, additional parking was also added.  Most recently, the ballroom renovation and stage enhancements have all been part of continuing Henry H. Stambaugh's legacy to provide a facility for the entertainment and education of the community.

One of the many projects completed in recent years was the restoration of the E.M. Skinner Pipe Organ, which is housed in the Concert Hall.  The restoration began in 2009 and was completed in the fall of 2011.  The organ was disassembled after years of neglect and water damage. It was shipped to New Haven, Connecticut to the Thompson Allen Company.  The father of the owner of the Thompson Allen Company worked for E.M. Skinner.  The Thompson Allen Company cleaned and repaired the instrument, which was then returned and reassembled. The Organ was restored to its original 1926 glory and was rededicated in October 2011.  It is currently the only E.M. Skinner organ in the area and one of few working ones in the entire country.  Guests marvel at the instrument, especially when on behind-the-scenes tours of the organ chambers.

Looking towards the future, an extensive exterior renovation to Stambaugh Auditorium will make the building look as it did when dedicated in 1926.  Cleaning the building will again reveal the fluted Ionic columns and the front iron scroll work.  Repointing the joints of the building will keep out moisture and make the building more efficient with heating and cooling. Additional lighting will provide spectacular night views of the building.  And last but not least, a complete restoration of the Fifth Avenue stairs is needed.  All improvements are necessary to continue the legacy of high standards that Stambaugh Auditorium has worked so diligently to achieve.

Events 

Stambaugh Auditorium has grown to be much more than a wedding venue.  With national tours, local shows, private events, fundraisers and dance competitions, Stambaugh has become very competitive in the local market as a premier event facility.  High school and college commencements, proms and business events are other examples of the variety of events that have grown in popularity over recent years.

Past National Acts 

1956
Chuck Berry,
Bill Haley & His Comets

1957
Roy Orbison,
Eddie Cochran,
Carl Perkins,
Gene Vincent & His Blue Caps,
The Drifters,
Fats Domino

1958
Dion & The Belmonts,
Bobby Darin,
Little Anthony & The Imperials,
The Isley Brothers,
The Everly Brothers,
Buddy Holly & The Crickets

1965
The Byrds,
Bo Diddley,
The Four Tops,
Stevie Wonder,
The Marvelettes,
The Spinners

1968
Ray Charles,
Johnny Cash,
James Brown,
Smokey Robinson & The Miracles

1970s
B.B. King,
The Temptations,
Little Richard,
The Beach Boys

1992
Bob Dylan,
Todd Rundgren

1996
Bruce Springsteen

2000
"Weird Al" Yankovic,
Jethro Tull,
Meat Loaf

2004
B.B. King,
Art Garfunkel,
Brad Paisley

2012
America

2013
Florida Georgia Line,
Parmalee,
Creedence Clearwater Revisited

2014
Josh Turner, 
R5, 
Kansas, 
Joe Nichols & Josh Thompson, 
Newsboys

2015
Fifth Harmony, 
TobyMac, 
Kirk Franklin, 
Kenny G

2016
Three Dog Night, 
Steven Curtis Chapman,
ZZ Top,
Kenny Rogers,
REO Speedwagon

2017
Old Dominion,
Styx,
Michael Bolton

2018
The Beach Boys

2019
John Mellencamp,
The Guess Who,
Glenn Miller Orchestra,
Celtic Woman

2020
The Oak Ridge Boys,
Kansas

Coming in 2017 

Old Dominion,
Gaither Vocal Band,
Styx

References

External links

National Register of Historic Places in Mahoning County, Ohio
Beaux-Arts architecture in Ohio
Buildings and structures in Youngstown, Ohio
Performing arts centers in Ohio
Concert halls in Ohio
Music venues in Ohio
Tourist attractions in Youngstown, Ohio
Event venues on the National Register of Historic Places in Ohio
1926 establishments in Ohio